Phillip Alford (born September 11, 1948) is an American former actor best known for his roles as Jem Finch in the 1962 film To Kill a Mockingbird, and Boy Anderson in Shenandoah (1965). After retiring from acting, he became a businessman.

Career
Alford appeared in three productions with Birmingham's Town and Gown Civic Theatre, whose director called up Alford's mother to see if her son was interested in auditioning for the part of Jem in To Kill a Mockingbird. Initially Alford had refused, but agreed to audition under the condition that he would miss half a day of school. As one of the three finalists, he was called to New York City for a screen test several weeks later and won the role of Jem Finch.

During the filming, his parents drove to Hollywood to be with him, and his sister became the stand-in actress for Mary Badham, who played Jem's sister, Scout, in the film. He and Badham were constantly bickering and at odds with each other during most of the shoot; at one time after their worst argument, he had planned mischief against her.

Alford's other acting credits include: Bristle Face (1964) (TV); the role of "Boy" in Shenandoah (1965); The Intruders (1970) (TV); and Fair Play (1972) (TV).

Personal life
Since retiring from acting, Alford now works as a businessman in Grenada, Mississippi and stays out of the limelight. He followed his father into the construction business. Alford is divorced and has two children.

Filmography

References

Further reading

 Holmstrom, John (1996). The Moving Picture Boy: An International Encyclopaedia from 1895 to 1995. Norwich: Michael Russell, p. 276.
 Dye, David (1988). Child and Youth Actors: Filmography of Their Entire Careers, 1914-1985. Jefferson, NC: McFarland & Co., p. 4.

External links

1948 births
Living people
People from Gadsden, Alabama
People from Grenada, Mississippi
American male child actors
American male film actors
American male television actors
Male actors from Alabama
Businesspeople from Mississippi
Ramsay High School alumni